Jubata al-Khashab is a town in southern Syria, administratively part of the Quneitra Governorate (Golan Heights), in the portion of the province under the United Nations Disengagement Observer Force Zone. According to the Syria Central Bureau of Statistics, Jubata al-Khashab had a population of 3,493 in the 2004 census. Its inhabitants are predominantly Sunni Muslims, although the population has decreased drastically due to the exodus of residents fleeing the violence of the Syrian Civil War. On 13 September 2015, army units killed and injured a number of militants and destroyed many of their hideouts in direct strikes targeting their gatherings in the village.

References

External links
 Qnaitra-map 19 K

Towns in Quneitra Governorate
Quneitra District